Calotis dentex, the white daisy-burr is a species of daisy found in forest areas on sandy or gravelly soil in eastern Australia, north of the Illawarra district. 

An erect, hairy, herbaceous plant to 80 centimetres tall. White flowers are often seen between the months of October to April. The specific epithet "dentex" refers to the toothed edges of the leaves. The type specimen was collected at Sydney by Robert Brown and later published by himself in 1820.

References 

Astereae
Plants described in 1820
Flora of New South Wales
Flora of Queensland